Ranger III is a 648-ton vessel built to carry visitors to Isle Royale National Park, on Lake Superior.
She was built in 1958, and has undergone several refits. The vessel is designed to carry 125 passengers, as well as 100 tons of cargo. She is designed to be operated by a crew of six when only carrying cargo, and by a crew of nine, when carrying passengers.

The vessel she replaced, Ranger II, was a war-surplus, wooden-hulled former minesweeper. The first Ranger was also a wooden-hulled military surplus vessel.

As built, she was powered by a pair of two-stroke diesel engines, generating , which were replaced by a pair of conventional diesel engines, generating . While the vessel is capable of light ice-breaking, in late spring or early fall, the heavy ice of winter requires shutting service down.

In 2012 the vessel's ballast water system was upgraded. Ballast water is subjected to filtration and ultraviolet light. The Milwaukee Journal-Sentinel published a series of articles on the threats invasive species posed to vulnerable native species, which praised the National Park Service's initiative in equipping Ranger III with a state of the art system.

While other vessels carry some of the visitors to the park, Ranger III removes all their trash.

Operational history

On 29 July 2015, Isle Royale Queen IV ran aground, and Ranger III was called upon to bring the other vessel's passengers to the mainland.

On 23 July 2016, the Portage Lake Lift Bridge broke down while Ranger was passing under it.

Replacement

The National Park Service is considering replacing Ranger III, either with a more modern vessel of similar capability, or several smaller, more specialized vessels.

References

External links

 Official Isle Royale National Park Ranger III information

Great Lakes ships
1958 ships
Isle Royale National Park
Ferries of Michigan
Ships built in Sturgeon Bay, Wisconsin